Luciad is an international supplier of geographic information system (GIS) tools. They provide products intended for. geospatial situational awareness. The company mainly focuses on the aviation, defense and security markets, Defence customers account for about 70% of its business.

In addition to its headquarters in Leuven (Belgium), Luciad has offices in the US, France, Germany, Mexico, as well as other territories. It works with organizations such as Eurocontrol, Boeing, Airbus Defence and Space.

Since 2008, Luciad technology has been used in supporting  SACT's objectives of improving the interoperability between NATO and national C4I systems and has been contracted by the NATO C3 Agency to deliver the software components for the visualization capability in its interim Joint Common Operational Picture. In 2016, Luciad announced a partnership with Sc2 Corp and IBM to develop social media analytics for  US Special Operations Command.

Luciad has also participated with Frontex, the European Organisation for Security (EOS) and the Aerospace and Defence Industries Association of Europe (ASD) on border security and border control

Luciad is one of several spin-offs of the KU Leuven.

History
After he obtained his doctorate at the KU Leuven in 1991, Dr. Lode Missiaen worked as a senior scientist at the NATO C3 Agency in The Hague, the Netherlands, where he was responsible for the study, development, and application of modern software technologies in the field of Air Traffic Control and Airspace Management.

With his colleague Thierry Salvant, they founded Luciad on March 22, 1999, together with management company R2I (acted as business angels). Gemma Frisius Fund (GFF), a seed capital fund established in 1997 as a joint venture between the KU Leuven,  KBC and BNP Paribas, provided further seed capital in September 2000.

Missiaen served as Group CEO from 1999 to 2012. Investment company Gimv acquired a majority stake in Luciad in 2013. In October 2017, Gimv and the other shareholders sold their stake in Luciad to the Swedish-headquartered Hexagon to strengthen their ability to deliver smart digital realities. This made Luciad a fully owned subsidiary of Hexagon which now operates under its Geospatial division.

Awards
Luciad won the 2016 Geospatial World Innovation Award for LuciadRIA, its 3D situational awareness app for browsers.

Luciad User Conference
Luciad hosts an annual User Conference for geospatial professionals and developers in Europe, with over 200 geospatial professionals from the Aviation, Defense, Maritime, Safety & Security and Utilities & Logistics domains. It is hosted in Brussels.

References

GIS companies
Belgian brands
Companies based in Leuven
Catholic University of Leuven
KU Leuven
Military industry
University spin-offs
Software companies established in 1999
Technology companies established in 1999
1999 establishments in Belgium